"Ces soirées-là" is a 2000 song recorded by French singer/rapper Yannick. It was the second single from his debut album C'est comme ça qu'on aime and was released in March 2000. Based on a Claude François' song (Cette année-là), it achieved a smash success in France, becoming one of the best-selling singles of all time.

Background and structure
In 1976, the band Four Seasons recorded the hit single "December, 1963 (Oh, What a Night)". The same year, Claude François adapted the song in French-language under the title "Cette année-là" ("That Year"). In 2000, Yannick made a partial cover of François' version: it used almost the same music, but changed the verses. The song, a "dancing and joyful rap", is "festive and lively". According to an analysis of an expert of French charts, the song is characterized by "the brass instruments support[ing] then punctuat[ing] the refrain, the rhythmic tune so characteristic (...) and the bass [playing] in the soloist passage"..  The lyric "avec bien plus de style que Travolta" pays homage to John Travolta as Tony Manero in Saturday Night Fever.

Chart performance
In France, the song debuted at No. 13 on 25 March 2000, then climbed and reached No. 1 three weeks later. It stayed there for 15 consecutive weeks, then dropped rather slowly. It totalled 24 weeks in the top ten, 36 weeks in the top 50 and 37 weeks on the chart (top 100) and was certified Diamond disc by the SNEP.

"Ces soirées-là" was also successful in Belgium (Wallonia). It went to number 33 on 6 May 2000 and reached number one three weeks later. After 10 weeks atop, it kept on dropping and fell off the chart (top 40) after a total of 24 weeks.

The song was No. 4 for two weeks in July 2000 in Switzerland, but remained on the chart for 30 weeks, 14 of them in the top ten.

Cover versions
The song was covered by The Song Family on the cover album of the same name.

Pierre Palmade and Patrick Timsit recorded their own version of the song on Les Enfoirés' album 2002: Tous dans le même bateau, on which it features as second track.

It is also the opening number in worldwide smash-hit musical Jersey Boys, which features the life story of Frankie Valli and the Four Seasons.

Track listings
 CD single
 "Ces soirées-là" (edit radio) – 3:21
 "Ces soirées-là" (extended version) – 4:43
 "Qui ne tente rien n'a rien" – 4:45
 Sales in private circuit
 "Ces soirées-là" (edit radio) – 3:21
 "Ces soirées-là" (house mix) – 5:08
 "Ces soirées-là" (version instrumentale) – 3:21
 "Ces soirées-là" (a capella) – 3:25

Charts

Weekly charts

Year-end charts

Certifications and sales

References

2000 singles
Yannick songs
Ultratop 50 Singles (Wallonia) number-one singles
SNEP Top Singles number-one singles
Songs written by Bob Gaudio
2000 songs